11/3/00 – Boise, Idaho is a two-disc live album and the seventieth in a series of 72 live bootlegs released by the American alternative rock band Pearl Jam from the band's 2000 Binaural Tour. It was released along with the other official bootlegs from the second North American leg of the tour on March 27, 2001.

Overview
The album was recorded on November 3, 2000, in Nampa, Idaho at the Idaho Center. The show features a particularly intense version of "Better Man". It was selected by the band as one of 18 "Ape/Man" shows from the tour, which, according to bassist Jeff Ament, were shows the band found "really exciting." Allmusic gave it two and a half out of a possible five stars. "Go" from this show appears on the Touring Band 2000 DVD.

Track listing

Disc one
"Of the Girl" (Gossard) – 4:58
"Go" (Dave Abbruzzese, Jeff Ament, Stone Gossard, Mike McCready, Eddie Vedder) – 2:47
"Corduroy" (Abbruzzese, Ament, Gossard, McCready, Vedder) – 4:29
"Grievance" (Vedder) – 3:22
"Last Exit" (Abbruzzese, Ament, Gossard, McCready, Vedder) – 2:37
"Tremor Christ" (Abbruzzese, Ament, Gossard, McCready, Vedder) – 6:17
"Elderly Woman Behind the Counter in a Small Town" (Abbruzzese, Ament, Gossard, McCready, Vedder) – 3:39
"Insignificance" (Vedder) – 4:16
"Animal" (Abbruzzese, Ament, Gossard, McCready, Vedder) – 3:28
"Nothing as It Seems" (Ament) – 5:38
"I Got Id" (Vedder) – 4:28
"Better Man" (Vedder) – 5:27
"Even Flow" (Vedder, Gossard) – 5:57
"Daughter" (Abbruzzese, Ament, Gossard, McCready, Vedder) – 7:58
"Light Years" (Gossard, McCready, Vedder) – 4:53

Disc two
"Jeremy" (Vedder, Ament) – 5:03
"Given to Fly" (McCready, Vedder) – 3:44
"Rearviewmirror" (Abbruzzese, Ament, Gossard, McCready, Vedder) – 8:14
"Encore Break" – 2:37
"Don't Be Shy" (Cat Stevens) – 3:21
"Black" (Vedder, Gossard) – 6:46
"Crazy Mary" (Victoria Williams) – 5:09
"Do the Evolution" (Gossard, Vedder) – 3:33
"Spin the Black Circle" (Abbruzzese, Ament, Gossard, McCready, Vedder) – 2:35
"State of Love and Trust" (Vedder, McCready, Ament) – 5:01
"Parting Ways" (Vedder) – 9:19
"Rockin' in the Free World" (Neil Young) – 6:24

Personnel
Pearl Jam
Jeff Ament – bass guitar, design concept
Matt Cameron – drums
Stone Gossard – guitars
Mike McCready – guitars
Eddie Vedder – vocals, guitars

Production
John Burton – engineering
Brett Eliason – mixing
Brad Klausen – design and layout

References

Pearl Jam Official Bootlegs
2001 live albums
Epic Records live albums